Leavitt Peak is located in the Emigrant Wilderness near Sonora Pass in the eastern Sierra Nevada range of California. Leavitt Peak is located on the Tuolumne County - Mono County line. The Pacific Crest Trail runs close to the east of Leavitt Peak, at an elevation of about  elevation. The peak offers views south to Yosemite National Park and north towards South Lake Tahoe.

Leavitt Peak is named for Hiram Leavitt, a native of New Hampshire and an early judge in Mono County. He built a hotel and home in 1863 at the foot of the east end of Sonora Pass to serve the growing number of travelers between Sonora and Aurora, primarily miners headed to the gold mines at nearby Bodie. Leavitt also erected a stagecoach station at what is called Leavitt Station. Leavitt Peak is a popular hiking destination. Leavitt Lake and Leavitt Meadow are nearby along the West Walker River and are also named for the early Leavitt family settlers.  Leavitt's is recorded on Charles F. Hoffmann's map of 1873. and Levitt Peak appears on the Mining Bureau map of 1891.

Climate
According to the Köppen climate classification system, Leavitt Peak is located in an alpine climate zone. Most weather fronts originate in the Pacific Ocean, and travel east toward the Sierra Nevada mountains. As fronts approach, they are forced upward by the peaks (orographic lift), causing moisture in the form of rain or snowfall to drop onto the range.

See also
 
 Night Cap Peak

References

External links 
 
 
 

Mountains of the Sierra Nevada (United States)
Mountains of Tuolumne County, California
Mountains of Mono County, California
Mountains of Northern California